Jay Fineberg (born 1956) is an Israeli physicist. He is a professor at the Racah Institute of Physics of the Hebrew University of Jerusalem. He is known for his work on various aspects of nonlinear physics, mainly in the fields of fracture ('how things break') and friction ('how things slide'). He is an elected fellow of the American Physical Society and the Israel Physical Society.

Education and career 
Fineberg studied both mathematics and physics at the Hebrew University of Jerusalem, graduating with Bachelor's degrees in both subjects in 1981. He later went on to earn his M.S. (1983) and Ph.D. (1988) in physics at the Weizmann Institute of Science. He then moved to the center for nonlinear dynamics at the University of Texas at Austin as a postdoc, where he started his career in the non-linear physics about fracture and friction.

Fineberg joined the Racah Institute of Physics of the Hebrew University of Jerusalem in 1992 and was appointed as a full professor in 2001. Fineberg served as the head of the Racah Institute of Physics (2005-2009), and as the Vice-Dean (2009-2011) and Dean (2016-2020) of the Faculty of Mathematics and Sciences.

Research 
Fineberg's research interests have been mainly focused on the physics of fracture and friction. His early work includes the study of experimental nonlinear dynamics and nonlinear pattern-forming systems. He discovered the localized micro-branching instabilities during the fast crack propagation and validated the nonlinear propagating solitary wave in the high-speed fracture process. Other interests include dynamics of crack propagation, crack tip singularity and crack fragmentation.

Meanwhile, Fineberg developed systematic experimental methods to study shear cracks, including real-time and high spatial observation of interfacial friction and laboratory earthquakes. He validated the linear elastic fracture mechanics at the early stage of friction. He recently investigated the microscopic friction nucleation and dynamics in both homogeneous and heterogeneous interfaces.

Awards and honors 
In 2011 Fineberg was elected a fellow of the American Physical Society, cited for "his clever experiments and analyses of the dynamics of nonequilibrium systems, particularly concerning the propagation and instabilities of cracks in solids and gels, the dynamics of friction and earthquakes, and instabilities in oscillated liquid layers." In 2021 he was elected a fellow of the Israel Physical Society for "his original and incisive contributions to the dynamics and instabilities of fractures, and the onset of dynamical friction."

Selected publications

References 

1956 births
Hebrew University of Jerusalem alumni
Academic staff of the Hebrew University of Jerusalem
Israeli physicists
Living people
Weizmann Institute of Science alumni
Fellows of the American Physical Society